The Three-Country Cairn is the point at which the international borders of Sweden, Norway and Finland meet, and the name of the monument that marks the point. It is an example of a geographical feature known as a tripoint. It is the northernmost international tripoint in the world.

The border between Norway and Sweden including Finland was decided in the Strömstad Treaty of 1751 and marked with cairns the following years, including cairn 294 which is located on a hill 150 meters east of today's Three-Country Cairn. When Sweden ceded Finland to Russia in 1809, it was decided that the new Finland–Sweden border should follow the rivers. The tripoint had no mark for several years. It was decided in 1887 by the governments of Norway and Russia (which was administering Finland at the time) that the southern river was now larger. A monument of stones was erected on the site by them in 1897. The Swedish could not agree on a boundary commission with the Norwegians and did not contribute their stone until 1901. This is Sweden's most northerly point and it is the westernmost point of the Finnish mainland (the most westerly point of Finland is on the island Märket).

The current tripoint monument was built in 1926 and is a beige, conical frustum made of concrete, located about  out in Lake Goldajärvi (also known as Koltajärvi in Finnish, Golddajávri in Sami or Koltajaure in Sweden). As an artificial island, it is sometimes mentioned as the world's smallest island divided by a border. This is a matter of definition. For example, in Haparanda/Tornio there are poles in water marking the border.

It may be reached by walking  from Kilpisjärvi in Finland along a hiking trail in the Malla Strict Nature Reserve. In summertime, it can be reached by public boat from Kilpisjärvi plus a  walk. It can also be reached from Norway, preferably from a hiking trail starting at road E8 near the border. It is much more difficult to reach from inside Sweden, requiring at least a 70 km hike each way with river crossings.

Climate

See also

Treriksrøysa – a cairn that marks the tripoint where the borders of Norway, Finland, and Russia meet.

References

Extreme points of Finland
Extreme points of Sweden
Geography of Norrbotten County
Finland–Sweden border
Finland–Norway border
Norway–Sweden border
Border tripoints
International islands
Storfjord
Geography of Lapland (Finland)
Artificial islands of Sweden
Artificial islands of Finland
Artificial islands of Norway